James Milholland (October 25, 1887 – February 14, 1956) was acting President of the Pennsylvania State University, serving from the death of Ralph Dorn Hetzel in 1947 until 1950. He later worked as a judge. He died after multiple heart attacks in 1956.

Minholland graduated from Pennsylvania State University in 1911, where he had been an undergraduate member of Phi Sigma Kappa fraternity.

References 

 

Presidents of Pennsylvania State University
1887 births
1956 deaths
20th-century American academics